Rhinegold is a 1978 West German drama film directed by Niklaus Schilling. It was entered into the 28th Berlin International Film Festival.

Cast
 Elke Haltaufderheide – Elisabeth Drossbach
 Rüdiger Kirschstein – Wolfgang Friedrichs
 Gunther Malzacher – Karl-Heinz Drossbach
 Alice Treff – Mutter
 Reinfried Keilich – Erfinder
 Alfred Baarovy – Astrologe
 Petra Maria Grühn – Junge Frau
 Franz Zimmermann – Großvater
 Ulrike Quien – Enkelin

See also
 Rheingold (train)

References

External links

1978 films
1978 drama films
German drama films
West German films
1970s German-language films
Films directed by Niklaus Schilling
Rail transport films
1970s German films